Vanino is the name of several inhabited localities in Russia.

Urban localities
Vanino, Khabarovsk Krai, a work settlement in Vaninsky District of Khabarovsk Krai

Rural localities
Vanino, Kirov Oblast, a village in Afanasyevsky District of Kirov Oblast
Vanino, Kursk Oblast, a selo in Medvensky District of Kursk Oblast
Vanino, Pskov Oblast, a village in Palkinsky District of Pskov Oblast
Vanino, name of several other rural localities

See also
Vaninsky